Tryne Bay is a bay about 3 nautical miles (6 km) wide at the northeast end of the Vestfold Hills, lying between the Tryne Islands and the coast. Charted by Norwegian cartographers from air photos taken by the Lars Christensen Expedition (1936–37) and named "Trynevika" (the snout bay).

Bays of Princess Elizabeth Land
Ingrid Christensen Coast